Prince Henry of Battenberg  (Henry Maurice; 5 October 1858 – 20 January 1896) was a morganatic descendant of the Grand Ducal House of Hesse. He became a member of the British royal family by marriage to Princess Beatrice of the United Kingdom, the youngest child of Queen Victoria.  Through his daughter, Victoria Eugenie, who became the queen consort of Spain, Henry is a direct ancestor of current members of the Spanish royal family.

Early life
Henry was born on 5 October 1858 in Milan, Lombardy–Venetia. He was the son of Prince Alexander of Hesse and by Rhine, and his wife Countess Julia von Hauke. His father was the third son and fourth child of Grand Duke Ludwig II of Hesse and Wilhelmina of Baden.

His parents' marriage was morganatic, as Julia was not considered a proper wife for a prince of a reigning dynasty, being only a countess. As such, at the time of his birth, Henry could not bear his father's title or name, and was styled His Illustrious Highness Count Henry of Battenberg. He was known as 'Liko' to his family. When his mother was raised to Princess von Battenberg and given the higher style of Her Serene Highness by Alexander's older brother, Louis III, Grand Duke of Hesse, Henry and his siblings shared in their mother's new rank. He became His Serene Highness Prince Henry of Battenberg, although he remained ineligible to inherit the throne of Hesse or to receive a civil list stipend.

Prince Henry received a military education and took up a commission as a lieutenant in the 1st Regiment of the Rhenish Hussars in the Prussian Army. He served in the Prussian Garde du Corps and was also Honorary Colonel of the 1st Infantry Regiment of Bulgaria, where his brother Alexander was Prince.

Marriage
Because of their close relationship to the Grand Ducal House of Hesse, the Battenbergs came into close contact with various ruling families of Europe, including the British Royal House. Henry's elder brother, Prince Louis of Battenberg, had married Princess Victoria of Hesse and by Rhine, his first cousin once-removed and a granddaughter of Queen Victoria, Empress of India. In 1884, Prince Henry  became engaged to Princess Beatrice, the fifth daughter and the youngest child of Queen Victoria and Albert, Prince Consort. Queen Victoria agreed to the marriage on the condition that the couple should make their home with her. The Queen-Empress formally gave her consent to the marriage at a meeting of Her Majesty's Most Honourable Privy Council on 27 January 1885.

On 22 July 1885, the Queen made Prince Henry a Knight of the Garter, and granted him the style Royal Highness to give him equal rank with his wife. This style took effect in the United Kingdom, but not in the German Empire (where the Prince was still considered a Serene Highness).

Beatrice and Henry were married at St Mildred's Church at Whippingham, near Osborne, on 23 July 1885.
On the same day, a bill to naturalise Prince Henry a British subject passed the House of Lords. The couple adopted the style, Their Royal Highnesses Prince and Princess Henry of Battenberg.

On 22 August 1885 he was made Honorary Colonel of the 5th (Isle of Wight, Princess Beatrice's) Volunteer Battalion, the Hampshire Regiment, In early 1886 it was announced in The Times that he would be made a captain in the 1st Life Guards, but the Secretary of State for War denied knowledge of this in the House of Commons and the appointment did not take place.

Prince and Princess Henry of Battenberg had four children. By Royal Warrant of 13 December 1886, the Queen granted their children the style Highness. This style took immediate effect in the United Kingdom and elsewhere except within the German Empire, where, as Princes and Princesses of Battenberg, they were only entitled to the style Serene Highness.

Later life and death

In 1889 Prince Henry was made Governor of Carisbrooke Castle and Captain-General and Governor of the Isle of Wight. He was made Lieutenant-Colonel in the Army on 21 June 1887, Colonel on 22 February 1893 and appointed to the Privy Council on 20 November 1894.

In November 1895, Prince Henry persuaded Queen Victoria to allow him to go to West Africa to fight in the Ashanti War. He served as the military secretary to the commander-in-chief of British forces, General Sir Francis Scott. His body was repatriated by the cruiser HMS Blenheim from the Canary Islands and his funeral service took place on 5 February 1896, at the same St. Mildred's Church, Whippingham on the Isle of Wight where he had been married. Interment followed in what became known as the Battenberg Chapel. The remains of his wife, Princess Beatrice, were placed there in August 1945 and those of his eldest son, the Marquess of Carisbrooke, in July 1961.

Beatrice's sister Louise told Sir James Reid of "Prince Henry's attempted relations with her, which she had declined."

Titles, styles, honours and arms

Titles and styles
5 October 1858 – 21 December 1858: His Illustrious Highness Count Henry of Battenberg
21 December 1858 – 20 January 1896: His Serene Highness Prince Henry of Battenberg
In the UK: 22 July 1885 – 20 January 1896: His Royal Highness Prince Henry of Battenberg

Honours

Arms

Issue

Ancestry

References

1858 births
1896 deaths
Deaths from malaria
House of Hesse-Darmstadt
Battenberg family
Infectious disease deaths in Sierra Leone
Members of the Privy Council of the United Kingdom
British Army General List officers
British military personnel of the Fourth Anglo-Ashanti War
Burials at St. Mildred's Church, Whippingham
Prussian Army personnel
German emigrants to England
German princes
Nobility from Milan
Royal Hampshire Regiment officers
Knights of the Garter
Grand Crosses of the Order of the Star of Romania
Recipients of the Order of the Cross of Takovo